Tabernaemontana cuspidata is a species of plant in the family Apocynaceae. It is found in northwestern South America.

References

cuspidata